Trimenia moorei, the bitter vine, is a climbing plant found in eastern Australia.

References

Austrobaileyales
Flora of New South Wales
Flora of Queensland
Plants described in 1870